Bruhagen is the administrative center of Averøy Municipality in Møre og Romsdal county, Norway.  The village is located on the east side of the island of Averøya, about midway between the villages of Bremsnes and Kvernes. Norwegian County Road 64 runs through the village.

References

Averøy
Villages in Møre og Romsdal